Allan Karlsson or Carlsson may refer to:

 Allan Karlsson (skier) (1911–1991), Swedish cross country skier
 Allan Karlsson (footballer), Swedish former footballer
Allan Carlsson (boxer)
Allan Carlsson (cyclist)

See also
Allan C. Carlson, historian